Denford is a small village and civil parish situated in North Northamptonshire, England. At the time of the 2001 census, the parish population was 250 people, increasing to 282 at the 2011 census.

The villages name means 'valley ford'. The village stands on the river Nene. It is in this area that the pronunciation of its name changes: upstream, to the south, it pronounced nen, while downstream to the north it is neen.

History
Denford is recorded in the Domesday Book of 1086. The manor of Denford was held by the Bishop of Coutances, and later by the de Clare family before settling by 1262 in the ownership of the Earls of Gloucester. They let the Denford estates to a series of families, including the Chamberlains and the Reades.

Heritage assets
The following buildings and structures are listed by Historic England as of special architectural or historic interest.

Church of The Holy Trinity (Grade I) 13th century 
Chest Tomb near Church of The Holy Trinity (Grade II) 16th century 
The Cock Public House (Grade II) 16th century 
Manor Farmhouse (Grade II) 17th century 
1 Freemans Lane (Grade II) 17th century 
The Cottage (Grade II) 17th century 
1, 2 and 3 Meadow Lane (Grade II) 17th century 
The Shires (Grade II) 17th century 
Denford North Lodge (Grade II) 18th century 
5, 7 and 9 Denford Road (Grade II) 18th century 
Debdale Cottage (Grade II) 18th century 
War Memorial (Grade II) 20th century

Demography

In 1801 there were 267 persons
In 1831 there were 319 persons
In 1841 there were 329 persons
In 2001 there were 250 persons
In 2011 there were 282 persons

References

External links

Villages in Northamptonshire
North Northamptonshire
Civil parishes in Northamptonshire